Gavin DeBartolo (born 29 March 1982) is an Australian born rugby union footballer (Retired) who played wing and fullback  for the USA Eagles he was a very talented classy player with speed to burn

DeBartolo qualified to play for the U.S. through his father Michael.

References

External links
 https://web.archive.org/web/20110727182332/http://web.usarugby.org/cgi-bin/viadesto/natteams/mnt/15ProfileDetail.pl?playerId=381

Australian people of Italian descent
Living people
1982 births
Rugby union players from Sydney
Rugby union wings
United States international rugby union players